Absalomichthys velifer is an extinct, prehistoric manefish that lived during the Upper Miocene of what is now Southern California.  Its dorsal fin was huge in comparison with living species.

See also

 Prehistoric fish
 List of prehistoric bony fish

References

Miocene fish
Caristiidae
Fossil taxa described in 1933
Miocene fish of North America